KDBR (106.3 FM, "106.3 The Bear") is a radio station licensed to serve Kalispell, Montana.  The station is owned by Bee Broadcasting, Inc. It airs a country music format.

All Bee Broadcasting stations are based at 2431 Highway 2 East, Kalispell.

The station was assigned the KDBR call letters by the Federal Communications Commission on May 28, 1993.

References

External links
KDBR official website
Bee Broadcasting

DBR
Country radio stations in the United States
Flathead County, Montana
Radio stations established in 1993
1993 establishments in Montana